The Caribou Mountains are a mountain range in Northern Alberta, Canada, surrounding a saucer-shaped elevated plateau that rises  above the surrounding lowlands. They rise north of the lower Peace River and are bounded to the north and east by Wood Buffalo National Park. The area was unglaciated during the last glacial period.

Because of their unique environment, the Caribou Mountains Wildland Park was created in 2001 as part of the Special Places program. The largest provincial wildland park in the province, its fragile ecosystem contains sensitive wetlands, permafrost habitat and rich bird breeding habitat. "A population of up to 120 wood bison, an endangered species, lives in the Wentzel Lake area in small groups of up to 15 animals."

Geography 

The region is an upland region surrounded by lowlands, but both are forested and are considered part of the Boreal Plains Ecozone by the Commission for Environmental Cooperation and the Mid-Continental Canadian forests by the World Wildlife Fund.

Boreal woodland caribou 
"The Park contains relatively undisturbed and lichen-rich forests, favoured habitat for woodland caribou. About 80 percent of the range of an important population of woodland caribou is contained within the Park, and about a third of Alberta's population of this threatened species is dependent on the Park."

See also
Mountains of Alberta
Geography of Alberta

Citations

References
 

Mountain ranges of Alberta
Northern Alberta
Physiographic regions of Canada